Durango Kids is a 1999 American live-action comedy-drama adventure film produced by Good Friends Productions that was released on October 10, 1999 by PorchLight Entertainment. The film won the 2001 Santa Clarita International Film Festival (now the International Family Film Festival) award for Best Cinematographer and the 2002 Moondance International Film Festival Seahorse award for film score.

The film was released to DVD by Lionsgate Home Entertainment on January 15, 2004.

References

External links
 

1990s adventure comedy-drama films
American adventure comedy-drama films
1999 films
1990s American films